Mark Trayle, born Mark Evan Garrabrant (January 17, 1955 in San Jose, California – February 18, 2015 in Ventura, California) was a California-based musician and sound artist working in a variety of media including live electronic music, improvisation, installations, and compositions for chamber ensembles. His work has been noted for its use of re-engineered consumer products and cultural artifacts as interfaces for electronic music performances and networked media installations.

Biography
Mark Trayle studied composition at the University of Oregon with Homer Keller, and at Mills College with Robert Ashley, David Behrman, and David Rosenboom. Under Berhman's tutelage he began building hybrid digital-analog electronics and used those (often with electric guitar and homemade performance interfaces) throughout the 1980s.
From the late 1980s through the mid-1990s his work focused on the use of alternative performance interfaces to guide algorithmic compositions, as well as composing for and performing with The Hub.  He also made his first sound/media installations during this period. In 1996 he moved from the San Francisco area to Southern California to teach at CalArts. Soon after, he composed a number of pieces for acoustic instruments with electronics. True North, Periodic Transmissions at Regular Intervals (are not allowed), and Propagation, Reflection, and Absorption are entirely acoustic in nature but use electronics and sensors to create real-time scores for the performers. Later works such as bitpool, sierranevada, and Bender use electronics that allow the players to trigger electroacoustic sounds.

Trayle's music has been the subject of articles in Strumenti Musicali and Virtual (Italy), Keyboard, and "Escape Velocity: Cyberculture at the End of the Century" (Grove/Atlantic), and he has written articles for Leonardo Music Journal (US/UK) and MusikTexte (Germany). He has recorded for the Artifact, Atavistic Records, CRI, Creative Sources, Inial, Los Angeles River, Elektra/Nonesuch, and Tzadik labels. He taught in the Herb Alpert School of Music at CalArts from 1996 - 2015.

Mark Trayle died on February 18, 2015, of pancreatic cancer, in his home in Ventura, CA.

Performance
Trayle has performed and exhibited at experimental music and new media venues and festivals in the U.S., Canada, and Europe. He has received grants from Arts International, American Composers Forum, The Japan Foundation and the National Endowment for the Arts. Commissions have come from Radio Bremen, Champs D’Action, Ensemble Zwischentoene, Kammerensemble Neue Musik Berlin, and Ensemble Mosaik. He has been an artist-in-residence at Mills College, STEIM, and The LAB.

Discography
 Five Lines (quintet project with Casey Anderson, Jason Kahn, Norbert Möslang, Günter Müller) Mikroton Recordings
 Timelines Los Angeles Jason Kahn Creative Sources
 Stationary (duo project with Toshimaru Nakamura) Creative Sources
 Goldstripe Creative Sources
 Boundary Layer (The Hub) Tzadik
 Die Zeit, Eine Gebrauchsanweisung (Michael Wertmueller) GROB
 Luminous Axis (Wadada Leo Smith) Tzadik
 RPM::MHZ Artifact 
 Music for Woodwinds & Electronics (Vinny Golia + Mark Trayle) Nine Winds
 Transmigration Music (compilation) CDCM/Centaur
 Light Upon Light (Wadada Leo Smith) Tzadik
 The Extended Flute (Maggi Payne) CRI
 State of The Union (compilation) Atavistic
 Wreckin' Ball (The Hub) Artifact
 Etudes and Bagatelles Artifact
 Computer Network Music (The Hub) Artifact
 Imaginary Landscapes (compilation) Elektra/Nonesuch
 Yes, Philip, Androids Dream Electric Sheep (Daniel Rothman) Los Angeles River Records
 Heart's Reflections (Wadada Leo Smith) Cuneiform

References

External links
Golden, Barbara. “Conversation with Mark Trayle.” eContact! 12.2 — Interviews (2) (April 2010). Montréal: CEC.

1955 births
2015 deaths
American male composers
American composers
California Institute of the Arts faculty
Deaths from cancer in California
Deaths from pancreatic cancer